Spring Break...Checkin' Out is the seventh extended play (EP) from American country music artist Luke Bryan. It was released on March 10, 2015, by Capitol Nashville as the last entry in Bryan's Spring Break collection. The EP is available in a full version, featuring five new tracks ("My Ol' Bronco", "Games", "Spring Breakdown", "Checkin' Out", "You and the Beach") in addition to the six from previous EP Spring Break 6...Like We Ain't Ever (2014), or a 5-song version, featuring only the new tracks.

Two songs from the extended play — "Games" and "Spring Breakdown" — were released as promotional singles. As of March 2015, the former and latter have each sold 54,000 and 31,000 copies in the US. The album debuted in the US at number 3 on the Billboard 200 chart and at number one on the Billboard Top Country Albums chart, his fifth chart leader on the latter.

Critical reception

Giving it 3 out of 5 stars, Stephen Thomas Erlewine of AllMusic wrote that "Sonically, the songs from the sixth and seventh EPs intertwine nicely — it's all bright and cheerful, sounding warm and open-hearted even in the shadow of the production's excessive gleam — but, appropriately enough, all the new songs find Bryan looking back over his shoulder at all the fun he's had over the years… Nevertheless, it's those five songs [from the five-song version] that provide a nice farewell to Bryan's time as the ringleader of Spring Break, and it's good to see that he's chosen to bring this era to a tidy close instead of letting it slip into memory." Bob Paxman of Country Weekly rated the album "C+", saying that "There is nothing remotely timeless about them…the songs are meant to speak to the moment, and the lyrics…reflect that." He thought that "Games" was the only song that "has any real meat to it", and praised the production, "which allows Luke plenty of space to operate."

Track listing

Personnel
Luke Bryan — lead vocals
Perry Coleman — background vocals
J.T. Corenflos — acoustic guitar, electric guitar
Kenny Greenberg — acoustic guitar, electric guitar
Greg Morrow — drums, drum loops, percussion
Danny Radar — banjo, bouzouki, acoustic guitar
Mike Rojas — Hammond B-3 organ, piano, synthesizer
Jimmie Lee Sloas — bass guitar
Jeff Stevens — acoustic guitar, electric guitar, gut string guitar, background vocals, producer
Jody Stevens — programming, synthesizer
Ilya Toshinsky — acoustic guitar, guitjo

Chart performance
Spring Break…Checkin' Out debuted at number 3 on the Billboard 200 chart and at number one on the Billboard Top Country Albums charts for the week ending of March 28, 2015, with 88,000 copies sold, or 106,000 units, including track and streaming equivalent albums. The album has sold 245,800 copies as of July 2015.

Weekly charts

Year-end charts

References

2015 EPs
Luke Bryan EPs
Capitol Records EPs